Linanthus is a genus of annual and perennial plants in the phlox family Polemoniaceae. The species are found in western North America and in Chile, with the greatest diversity in California.

The stems are erect, with multiple branches arising directly from the base, and grow 2–15 cm tall. The leaves are stem-like (cauline) and opposite, with shapes ranging from entire to palmately lobed, the 3-9 lobes being linear to lanceolate or spatulate.

The genus name is from the Greek for "flax flower", since the flowers superficially resemble those of flax. The genus has recently been split, with many of the species formerly included now transferred to the genus Leptosiphon (Jepson Manual).

Selected species
 Linanthus bellus (Gray) Greene
 Linanthus bigelovii (A. Gray) Greene
 Linanthus concinnus Milliken
 Linanthus demissus (A. Gray) Greene
 Linanthus dianthiflorus (Benth.) Greene
 Linanthus dichotomus Benth.
 Linanthus filiformis (Parry ex A. Gray) J.M. Porter & L.A. Johnson
 Linanthus inyoensis (I.M.Johnst.) J.M.Porter & L.A.Johnson
 Linanthus jonesii (A. Gray) Greene
 Linanthus killipii H. Mason
 Linanthus maculatus (Parish) Milliken
 Linanthus orcuttii (Parry & A. Gray) Jeps.
 Linanthus parryae (A. Gray) Greene
 Linanthus pungens (Torr.) J.M. Porter & L.A. Johnson 
 Linanthus watsonii (A. Gray) J.M. Porter & L.A. Johnson

Species formerly treated in Linanthus, now  transferred to Leptosiphon
 Leptosiphon acicularis
 Leptosiphon ambiguus
 Leptosiphon androsaceus
 Leptosiphon arenicola
 Leptosiphon aureus
 Leptosiphon bicolor
 Leptosiphon bolanderi
 Leptosiphon breviculus
 Leptosiphon ciliatus
 Leptosiphon filipes
 Leptosiphon floribundus
 Leptosiphon grandiflorus
 Leptosiphon harknessii
 Leptosiphon lemmonii
 Leptosiphon liniflorus
 Leptosiphon montanus
 Leptosiphon nudatus
 Leptosiphon nuttallii
 Leptosiphon oblanceolatus
 Leptosiphon pachyphyllus
 Leptosiphon parviflorus
 Leptosiphon pygmaeus
 Leptosiphon rattanii
 Leptosiphon septentrionalis
 Leptosiphon serrulatus

References

Jepson Manual: Linanthus
Robert W. Patterson (1977) Madroño 24: 36–48

 
Polemoniaceae genera
Flora of California